"Infra-Red" is a song by Canadian rock band Three Days Grace. It was the second single from their sixth studio album Outsider. It topped the Billboard Mainstream Rock Songs chart in September 2018. It became the band's fourteenth song to top the chart.

Background
After releasing "The Mountain" as the first single from their sixth studio album Outsider, the band chose "Infra-Red" as the album's second single. It was released as a single on June 12, 2018. A lyric video was released on July 9, 2018, with the lyrics displayed in a dark warehouse with red tinges of color. In September 2018, the song topped the Billboard Mainstream Rock chart, their fourteenth song to do so, surpassing Van Halen for the act with the most number-one songs on the chart since its inception in 1981. While the album version is a full band, electric performance, an acoustic rendition of the song was recorded in April 2018 for Radio.com.

The song was written by Neil Sanderson, Gavin Brown, Barry Stock, Brad Walst, Matt Walst, Dan Kanter and Isiah Steinberg. In 2018, the song won the SOCAN Awards for "No. 1 Song of the Year".

Personnel
Three Days Grace
 Matt Walst – lead vocals, rhythm guitar
 Barry Stock – lead guitar
 Brad Walst – bass guitar
 Neil Sanderson – drums

Production
 Gavin Brown – producer
 Howard Benson – producer
 Three Days Grace – producer
 Mike Plotnikoff – engineer 
 Chris Lord-Alge – mixing
 Ted Jensen - mastering

Charts

Weekly charts

Year-end charts

References

2018 singles
2018 songs
Three Days Grace songs
Songs written by Neil Sanderson
Songs written by Barry Stock
Songs written by Gavin Brown (musician)
Songs written by Dan Kanter
Song recordings produced by Gavin Brown (musician)